Jurien Island is a small island lying north of Cape Leguillou, the northern tip of Tower Island, in the Palmer Archipelago, Antarctica. The island was first charted and named by Captain Jules Dumont d'Urville on March 4, 1838.

See also 
 List of Antarctic and sub-Antarctic islands

References

Islands of the Palmer Archipelago